Baron  was a Japanese politician and Prime Minister of Japan.

Early life 
Wakatsuki Reijirō was born on 21 March 1866, in Matsue, Izumo Province (present day Shimane Prefecture), the second son of samurai foot soldier (ashigaru) Okumura Sensaburō and his wife Kura. Though the family was of the samurai warrior nobility, they were very poor, and worked side jobs to finally support themselves. When Reijirō was three years old, his mother died. As the father and the eldest brother were ordered to work in Yamazaki, Kyoto by the Matsue Domain, the responsibilities of the house fell onto Reijirō's 11-year-old elder sister Iwa who took care of the three-year-old Reijirō while having a side job. The Okumura family were low-ranking even among the ashigaru, and the family could not have a residence near the center of Sakaimachi. For this reason, the family lived in a rented house on the outskirts of the town, but by the time Reijirō was born, his father had just constructed a small house in Nishitanaka.

At the time, samurai were required to wear their katana (typically two), and Reijirō commuted to temple school wearing only one wooden sword on his hip. After graduating from elementary school, he entered a Chinese literary school, but quit the following year entering a middle school in Matsue. However, he was forced to quit middle school in just eight months because his family could not afford the tuition fees. After quitting school, he collected firewood in the mountains and helped with house chores.

At the age of 16, he began working as an elementary school substitute teacher. In 1883, he decided to enter the Imperial Japanese Army Academy as the tuition fees were government expensed, but failed the physical examination. The next year, he heard about student recruitment by the Law School of the Ministry of Justice, which also had its tuition fees covered by the government. However, the examination took place in Tokyo, and the travel fees were not covered. He consulted his uncle, who was the head of Nogi District, and was able to borrow 30 yen from him. In 1884, Reijirō left Matsue at the age of 19.

Reijirō adopted the surname Wakatsuki after marrying into the family of his wife, since that family had no male heir. He enrolled in the Tokyo Imperial University in 1892 and studied law.

Early career 
After graduation, Wakatsuki worked in the Ministry of Finance as tax bureau director and later as vice-minister. In 1911 he was appointed to the House of Peers. He then served as Minister of Finance under the 3rd Katsura administration and 2nd Ōkuma administration in the early 1910s and became a leading member of the Rikken Dōshikai political party, and its successor the Kenseikai, in 1914.

In June 1924, Wakatsuki was named Home Minister in the cabinet of Prime Minister Katō Takaaki, and worked to enact the Universal Manhood Suffrage Law and the Peace Preservation Law in 1925.

As Prime Minister 

On 30 January 1926, on Katō's unexpected death in office, Wakatsuki took over as Prime Minister of Japan. His first term lasted to 20 April 1927 when he was forced to resign during the Shōwa financial crisis.

Wakatsuki was awarded the Order of the Paulownia Flowers on November 10, 1928. After serving as chief delegate plenipotentiary to the London Naval Conference 1930, Wakatsuki pushed strongly for speedy ratification of the disarmament treaty, thus earning the wrath of the Japanese military and various ultranationalist groups.

After Prime Minister Hamaguchi was forced out of office by the severe injuries incurred in an assassination attempt, Wakatsuki assumed the leadership of the Rikken Minseitō, the successor to the Kenseikai. He was elevated to the rank of baron (danshaku) in the kazoku peerage system in April 1931.  Wakatsuki once again became Prime Minister from 14 April 1931 to 13 December 1931. During Wakatsuki's second term, he failed to control the Imperial Japanese Army. He was unable either to prevent the Manchurian Incident from occurring, or to rein in the Army from further escalation of hostilities in China afterwards.

Later life
After his retirement as Prime Minister, Wakatsuki became president of the Rikken Minseitō in July 1934. Despite the growing militarism in Japanese society, he continued  to oppose the Second Sino-Japanese War, and was adamantly opposed to extending the war to include the United States and other western powers. Even after the declaration of hostilities in World War II, he publicly stated the war should end as quickly as possible. In May 1945, on hearing of the collapse of Nazi Germany, he emerged from retirement to urge Prime Minister Kantarō Suzuki to open negotiations with the United States as soon as possible.  In August, he participated in the government panel recommending unconditional acceptance of the Potsdam Declaration.

After the surrender of Japan, Wakatsuki was subpoenaed by the Supreme Commander of the Allied Powers in June 1946 as a prosecution witness at The International Military Tribunal for the Far East. Wakatsuki died of Angina pectoris at his summer home in Itō, Shizuoka on November 20, 1949. His grave is at the Somei Cemetery in downtown Tokyo.

Honours
From the corresponding article in the Japanese Wikipedia
Grand Cordon of the Order of the Sacred Treasure (24 August 1911; Fifth Class: 28 December 1902)
Grand Cordon of the Order of the Rising Sun (14 July 1916; Second Class: 1 April 1906)
Grand Cordon of the Order of the Rising Sun with Paulownia Flowers (10 November 1928)
Baron (11 April 1931)

See also 
 History of Japan

References
 Bix, Herbert P. (2000). Hirohito and the Making of Modern Japan. New York: HarperCollins. ; 
 Brendon, Piers. The Dark Valley: A Panorama of the 1930s. Vintage; Reprint edition (2002). 
 Jansen, Marius B. (2000). The Making of Modern Japan. Cambridge: Harvard University Press. ;  OCLC 44090600
 Toland, John. The Rising Sun: The Decline and Fall of the Japanese Empire, 1936–1945. Modern Library; Reprint edition (2003).

Notes

|-

|-

|-

|-

|-

1866 births
1949 deaths
20th-century prime ministers of Japan
Prime Ministers of Japan
People from Shimane Prefecture
Kazoku
Members of the House of Peers (Japan)
People of Meiji-period Japan
University of Tokyo alumni
Rikken Dōshikai politicians
20th-century Japanese politicians
Kenseikai politicians
Ministers of Finance of Japan
Government ministers of Japan
Rikken Minseitō politicians
Recipients of the Order of the Paulownia Flowers
Politicians from Shimane Prefecture